{{DISPLAYTITLE:Ohsawa–Takegoshi L2 extension theorem}}

It was discovered by Takeo Ohsawa and Kensho Takegoshi in 1987, using what have been described as ad hoc methods involving twisted Laplace–Beltrami operators, but simpler proofs have since been discovered. Many generalizations and similar results exist, and are known as theorems of Ohsawa–Takegoshi type.

See also 
Suita conjecture

note

References

External links

Analytic Methods in Algebraic Geometry (OpenContent book See B5)

Mathematical theorems
Several complex variables